No Surrender (2015) (also known as  Impact Wrestling: No Surrender) was a professional wrestling event produced by Total Nonstop Action Wrestling (TNA). It took place at the Impact Wrestling Zone in Orlando, Florida on June 27, 2015. It was the eleventh event under the No Surrender chronology and aired as a special edition of TNA's weekly broadcast of Impact Wrestling on Destination America on August 5, 2015.

Six professional wrestling matches were contested at the event. The main event was a Full Metal Mayhem match for the TNA World Heavyweight Championship, in which Ethan Carter III successfully defended the title against Matt Hardy. The undercard notably featured Austin Aries' last match in TNA against Rockstar Spud, which stipulated that if Aries won then he would take Spud's "Rockstar" nickname and if Spud won then Aries would have to leave TNA, which Aries lost.

Storylines
No Surrender featured professional wrestling matches that involved different wrestlers from pre-existing scripted feuds and storylines. Wrestlers portrayed villains, heroes, or less distinguishable characters in the scripted events that built tension and culminated in a wrestling match or series of matches.

Event

Preliminary matches
The event kicked off with a match between Mr. Anderson and Bram. Bram tried to hit Anderson with a microphone but Anderson countered with a small package and pinned Bram for the win. Bram hit Anderson with the microphone after the match.

After the match, James Storm cut a promo insulting his Revolution teammate Khoya and Khoya retaliated by hitting a Sky High to Storm and proclaimed that his name was Mahabali Shera.

Next, Gail Kim took on The Dollhouse (Taryn Terrell, Jade and Marti Bell) in a 3-on-1 Handicap match. Dollhouse triple teamed Kim throughout the match until Kim gained momentum which led to Terrell retreating from the ring and she escaped through the crowd. Kim then countered a double suplex by Jade and Bell and dropkicked both of them and nailed an Eat Defeat to Bell for the win.

Next, Eli Drake took on Drew Galloway. Drake poked Galloway in the eye and rolled him up and grabbed the ropes for leverage to pin him for the win.

Later, Austin Aries took on Rockstar Spud in a match which stipulated that if Aries won then he would get Spud's "Rockstar" nickname and if Spud won then Aries would be forced to leave TNA. Spud countered a back superplex by Aries into an Underdog for the win, thus forcing Aries to leave TNA.

This was followed by the penultimate match of the event between Mahabali Shera and James Storm. Storm hit Shera with a cowbell, thus getting disqualified.

Main event match
The main event was a Full Metal Mayhem match, in which Ethan Carter III defended the World Heavyweight Championship against Matt Hardy. After knocking off EC3 through a table with a diving leg drop from a ladder, Hardy climbed the ladder to retrieve the title belt. EC3 then hit a chair to Hardy's knee and then kicked his knee out to send Hardy to the mat and then climbed the ladder and retrieved the title belt to retain the title.

Results

References

2015 in professional wrestling
2015 American television episodes
2010s American television specials
Professional wrestling in Orlando, Florida
2015 in Florida
June 2015 sports events in the United States
Events in Orlando, Florida